Sir John Jacob Buxton, 2nd Baronet  (13 August 1788 – 13 October 1842) was a  politician from Shadwell Court in Brettenham, Norfolk who sat in the House of Commons from 1818 to 1832.

Buxton was the eldest son of Sir Robert Buxton, 1st Baronet and his wife Juliana Mary Beevor. He led the life of well-to-do Victorian country gentlemen, and concentrated on his estates, administrative offices and charitable work in the county and the cultivation of an agreeable social life.

Buxton was elected Member of Parliament for  Great Bedwyn  in 1818 and held the seat until it was replaced under the Great Reform Act in 1832. He succeeded to the title of 2nd Baronet Buxton, of Shadwell Lodge, Norfolk  on 7 June 1839 and was High Sheriff of Norfolk in 1841. He enlarged Shadwell Lodge to the designs of Edward Blore, one of the leading  architects of the time and the house was enlarged and remodelled in the Jacobean style between 1840 and 1842.

Buxton died aged 54 at Tunbridge Wells, Kent. He married Elizabeth Cholmeley, daughter of Sir Montague Cholmeley, 1st Baronet and Elizabeth Harrison, on 5 August 1825 at St. George's Church, St. George Street, Hanover Square, London. His son Robert succeeded him in the baronetcy. His daughter Elizabeth married Walter Spencer-Stanhope.

References

External links 
 

1788 births
1842 deaths
People educated at Harrow School
Alumni of Christ Church, Oxford
Members of the Parliament of the United Kingdom for English constituencies
UK MPs 1818–1820
UK MPs 1820–1826
UK MPs 1826–1830
UK MPs 1830–1831
UK MPs 1831–1832
Baronets in the Baronetage of Great Britain
High Sheriffs of Norfolk
People from Breckland District
Members of Parliament for Great Bedwyn